WGHN (1370 kHz) is an AM radio station licensed to Grand Haven, Michigan. The station broadcasts an adult contemporary format.

History
WGHN signed on the air on July 16, 1956.  The station was founded by Robert Runyon and Robert Kirby, former employees of WOOD radio and television in Grand Rapids.  WGHN went through several ownership changes in the next decade. Over the years, the station also moved several times, from its original studios on Washington Avenue (above Grand Haven Jewelry) to Franklin Avenue to South Seventh Street; WGHN has been housed at its current location on South Harbor Street in Grand Haven since 1985.

WGHN-FM 92.1 was added on January 28, 1969.  In 1976 the station changed its call letters to WFMG (those calls are now used at 101.3 FM in Richmond, Indiana) and separated programming from its AM sister, airing an easy listening format while the AM station continued with a format of adult contemporary music and talk.  After the stations were sold in 1983, the FM's call letters were changed back to WGHN-FM and the two stations resumed simulcasting, which continued until January 4, 2008.

2007-08: Sale and Changes

WGHN owners Bill Struyk, President and General Manager, and Ron Mass, Vice President (known on the air as "Ron Stevens"), announced in April 2007 that they were selling WGHN and WGHN-FM to Lansing-based businessman Will Tieman, owner of Michigan State University's Spartan Sports Network. Struyk told the Grand Haven Tribune that he and Mass were both ready for retirement (1). Despite speculation that Tieman would try to move WGHN out of Grand Haven to become a Muskegon- or Grand Rapids-market station, Tieman told The Muskegon Chronicle that he did not plan to make any major programming changes (see: "New owner plans to keep WGHN local," The Muskegon Chronicle, 8 May 2007) 1, nor would he immediately discontinue WGHN's University of Michigan sports broadcasts in favor of Michigan State sports.

In early January 2008, Will Tieman discontinued WGHN's simulcast of the FM signal and changed the format to ESPN Radio.

On May 25, 2018 WGHN changed their format from ESPN sports to oldies, branded as "Oldies 94.9".

On November 21, 2022 WGHN temporarily replaced its oldies format with WGHN-FM's adult contemporary format, due to WGHN-FM being off the air.

Current Programming

In the fall, Spring Lake High School football airs on Friday nights.  Saturdays in the fall have University of Michigan Football on Oldies 94.9/1370 and Michigan State University football on WGHN-FM. In the winter Spring Lake High School Basketball airs on Tuesday and Friday nights.

Previous Logo

Sources
Michiguide.com-WGHN History

References

External links

GHN
Mainstream adult contemporary radio stations in the United States
Radio stations established in 1956
1956 establishments in Michigan
Grand Haven, Michigan